Charles Duffy may refer to:

 Charles Gavan Duffy (1816–1903), Irish nationalist, journalist, poet and Australian politician
 Charles John Duffy (1919–1941), U.S. Navy officer
 Charles Lee Duffy (born 1976), American serial killer